Harpalus ebeninus is a species of ground beetle in the subfamily Harpalinae. It was described by Heyden in 1870.

References

ebeninus
Beetles described in 1870